The 2003 WNBA season was the 4th for the Indiana Fever. The Fever attempted to reach the playoffs, but they fell short by one game.

Offseason

Dispersal Draft

WNBA Draft

Regular season

Season standings

Season schedule

Player stats

References

Indiana Fever seasons
Indiana
Indiana Fever